José Ramón Sandoval Huertas (born 2 May 1968) is a Spanish football manager.

Football career
After coaching several amateur teams in the Community of Madrid, whilst also working as a cook in his family business, Madrid-born Sandoval joined Rayo Vallecano B in early 2007, taking the club to runner-up honours in the Copa Federación de España the following year and achieving promotion to Segunda División B for the first time in its history in 2010. For the 2010–11 season he was appointed manager of the first team, helping them return to La Liga after an absence of eight years and being awarded the Miguel Muñoz Trophy as best manager in Segunda División in the process.

Sandoval returned to the second division on 18 October 2012 after being appointed at Sporting de Gijón, replacing fired Manolo Sánchez. He was sacked on 4 May 2014, with the team in seventh position.

On 1 May 2015, Sandoval took charge of Granada CF until the end of the campaign. He managed to collect ten points in only four games, helping the side finally avoid relegation as 17th.

On 22 February 2016, Sandoval was dismissed after losing 1–2 at home to Valencia CF the day before, and was replaced by José González. On 13 February 2018, after more than a year without a club, he was appointed manager of Córdoba CF.

After managing to avoid relegation, Sandoval left Córdoba on 12 June 2018 as his contract expired. On 3 August, however, he replaced departing Francisco at the helm of the very same club. He left the Estadio Nuevo Arcángel on 18 November, this time as the board's decision following a 3–1 home loss to Andalusian neighbours Cádiz CF.

On 11 March 2020, after another lengthy period of inactivity, Sandoval took over for the fired Mere at second-tier newcomers CF Fuenlabrada. The following 2 February, he was relieved of his duties.

Sandoval returned to Fuenla on 7 March 2022, replacing the dismissed Sergio Pellicer.

Managerial statistics

References

External links

1968 births
Living people
Sportspeople from Madrid
Spanish football managers
La Liga managers
Segunda División managers
Tercera División managers
Rayo Vallecano managers
Sporting de Gijón managers
Granada CF managers
Córdoba CF managers
CF Fuenlabrada managers